The Toyota GR Yaris Rally1 is a Rally1 car built by Toyota Gazoo Racing WRT that has been driven in the World Rally Championship since . The prototype car is based on the GR Yaris production car. The car won the Autosport Awards Rally Car of the Year in 2022.

World Rally Championship results

Championship titles

WRC victories

Rally results

Complete World Rally Championship results 

* Season still in progress.

References

External links 

Toyota GR Yaris Rally1 at eWRC-results.com

GR Yaris Rally1
Rally1 cars
All-wheel-drive vehicles
World Rally championship-winning cars